Scrobipalpa ergasima is a moth of the family Gelechiidae. Edward Meyrick first used the scientific name in 1916. It is found in the Mediterranean Region and on the Canary Islands. Outside of Europe, it is found in Egypt, Saudi Arabia, the Democratic Republic of the Congo, Namibia, South Africa, Sudan, Australia, India, Indonesia, Myanmar and Pakistan.

The forewings are brownish, irrorated with whitish and dark fuscous. The hindwings are grey.

The larvae feed on Hyoscyamus albus, Solanum melongena and Solanum nigrum. They mine the leaves of their host plant. The mine has the form of a full-depth transparent blotch. A single larva makes several mines. Pupation takes place outside of the mine. The larvae have a light brown body and black head. They can be found from March to October.

References

External links

Moths described in 1916
Scrobipalpa
Moths of Europe
Moths of Asia